Paul McCormack (born 26 July 1963) is an Irish former cyclist. He competed in the road race at the 1988 Summer Olympics.

References

External links
 

1963 births
Living people
Irish male cyclists
Olympic cyclists of Ireland
Cyclists at the 1988 Summer Olympics
Sportspeople from Dublin (city)
Rás Tailteann winners